Adelpha nea, the Nea sister, is a butterfly of the family Nymphalidae. It was described by William Chapman Hewitson in 1847. It is found from south-eastern Mexico, Belize and Costa Rica to Venezuela and southern Peru, the Guianas and Amazonian Brazil.

The larvae feed on Miconia species.

Subspecies
Adelpha nea nea (Costa Rica to Venezuela, southern Peru, the Guianas, Amazonian Brazil)
Adelpha nea sentia Godman & Salvin, [1884] (south-eastern Mexico, Belize)

References

 Adelpha nea at Butterflies of America

Butterflies described in 1847
Adelpha
Fauna of Brazil
Nymphalidae of South America
Butterflies of Central America
Taxa named by William Chapman Hewitson